Dashtserengiin Saintsetseg (born September 19, 1990 in Erdenet) is a Mongolian swimmer, who specialized in sprint freestyle events. Dashtseren represented Mongolia at the 2008 Summer Olympics in Beijing, and competed for the women's 50 m freestyle event. She swam in the fourth heat of the competition, finishing in fifth place, with a time of 29.63 seconds. Dashtseren, however, failed to advance into the semi-finals, as she placed sixty-seventh in the overall rankings.

References

External links
 
NBC Olympics Profile

1990 births
Living people
People from Erdenet
Mongolian female swimmers
Olympic swimmers of Mongolia
Swimmers at the 2008 Summer Olympics
Mongolian female freestyle swimmers
21st-century Mongolian women